{{Infobox election
| election_name      = 1997 Irish general election
| country            = Ireland
| type               = parliamentary
| ongoing            = no
| previous_election  = 1992 Irish general election
| previous_year      = 1992
| previous_mps       = Members of the 27th Dáil
| next_election      = 2002 Irish general election
| next_year          = 2002
| seats_for_election = 166 seats in Dáil Éireann
| majority_seats     = 84
| election_date      = 6 June 1997
| elected_mps        = TDs elected

| image1         = 
| leader1        = Bertie Ahern
| leader_since1  = 19 December 1994
| party1         = Fianna Fáil
| leaders_seat1  = Dublin Central
| last_election1 = 68 seats, 39.1%
| seats_before1  = 67
| seats1         = 77
| seat_change1   =  9
| popular_vote1  = 703,700
| percentage1    = 39.3%
| swing1         =  0.2%

| image2         = 
| leader2        = John Bruton 
| leader_since2  = 20 November 1990
| party2         = Fine Gael
| leaders_seat2  = Meath
| last_election2 = 45 seats, 24.5%
| seats_before2  = 47
| seats2         = 54
| seat_change2   =  9
| popular_vote2  = 499,900
| percentage2    = 27.9%
| swing2         =  3.4%

| image3         = 
| leader3        = Dick Spring
| leader_since3  = November 1982
| party3         = Labour Party (Ireland)
| leaders_seat3  = Kerry North
| last_election3 = 33 seats, 19.9%
| seats_before3  = 32
| seats3         = 17
| seat_change3   =  16
| popular_vote3  = 186,000
| percentage3    = 10.4%
| swing3         =  8.9%

| image4         = 
| leader4        = Mary Harney
| leader_since4  = 12 October 1993
| party4         = Progressive Democrats
| leaders_seat4  = Dublin South-West
| last_election4 = 10 seats, 4.7%
| seats_before4  = 8
| seats4         = 4
| seat_change4   =  6
| popular_vote4  = 83,800 
| percentage4    = 4.7%
| swing4         =  0.0%

| image5         = 
| leader5        = 
| leader_since5  = 1992
| party5         = Democratic Left (Ireland)
| leaders_seat5  = Dublin North-West
| last_election5 = 4 seats, 2.8%
| seats_before5  = 6
| seats5         = 4
| seat_change5   = 
| popular_vote5  = 44,900
| percentage5    = 2.5%
| swing5         =  0.3%

| image6         =  Green 
| leader6        = —
| leader_since6  = —
| party6         = Green Party (Ireland)
| leaders_seat6  = —
| last_election6 = 1 seat, 1.4%
| seats_before6  = 1
| seats6         = 2
| seat_change6   =  1
| popular_vote6  = 49,300
| percentage6    = 2.8%
| swing6         =  1.4%

| image7         = 
| leader7        = Gerry Adams
| leader_since7  = 13 November 1983
| party7         = Sinn Féin
| leaders_seat7  = Did not stand| last_election7 = 0
| seats_before7  = 0
| seats7         = 1
| seat_change7   =  1
| popular_vote7  = 45,614
| percentage7    = 2.5%
| swing7         =  0.9%

| image8         = 
| leader8        = Joe Higgins
| leader_since8  = 
| party8         = Socialist Party (Ireland)
| leaders_seat8  = Dublin West
| last_election8 = New
| seats_before8  = 0
| seats8         = 1
| seat_change8   =  1
| popular_vote8  = 12,445
| percentage8    = 0.7%
| swing8         =  0.7%

| map_image       = Irish_general_election_1997.png
| map_size        = 400px
| map_caption     = Percentage of seats gained by each of the three major parties, and number of seats gained by smaller parties and independents.

| title           = Taoiseach
| posttitle       = Taoiseach after election
| before_election = John Bruton
| before_party    = Fine Gael
| after_election  = Bertie Ahern
| after_party     = Fianna Fáil
| turnout         = 65.9%  2.6pp
}} 
The 1997 Irish general election''' to the 28th Dáil was held on Friday, 6 June, following the dissolution of the 27th Dáil on 15 May by President Mary Robinson, on the request of Taoiseach John Bruton. The general election took place in 41 Dáil constituencies throughout Ireland for 166 seats in Dáil Éireann, the house of representatives of the Oireachtas, under a revision in the Electoral (Amendment) Act 1995.

The two largest parties, Fine Gael and Fianna Fáil, increased both their vote totals and representation, while both the "junior" parties in the Dáil, the Labour Party and the Progressive Democrats, had disastrous campaigns that saw their representation in the Dáil slashed by 50% or greater. However, some of the other "minor" parties in the Dáil saw improvements: for the first time in 75 years a Sinn Féin TD took their seat in the Dáil after Caoimhghín Ó Caoláin was elected, while the Green party added a second TD and the Socialist Party gained their first ever national representative in Joe Higgins.

Following the election, the 28th Dáil met at Leinster House on 26 June to nominate the Taoiseach for appointment by the president and to approve the appointment of a new government of Ireland. Bertie Ahern was appointed Taoiseach, forming the 25th Government of Ireland, a minority coalition government of Fianna Fáil and the Progressive Democrats.

The election has been described by Irish Independent'' journalist Shane Coleman as a prelude to the "golden years" of the Celtic Tiger, and thus one of the most significant general elections in Irish history.

Background
The maximum amount of time between a general election in Ireland is five years, and thus the ruling "Rainbow Coalition" of Fine Gael, the Labour Party and Democratic Left knew an election would have to be called in mid to late 1997. Fine Gael had wanted to wait until the autumn to call the election, but Labour were keen to fight their campaign in the summer. Anticipating the election, on 14 April 1997 during their annual party conference, Labour leader Dick Spring declared "I will not, in the aftermath of the next general election, come before you and recommend any form of coalition with either of the parties that make up the centre-right alternative, the Progressive Democrats or Fianna Fail", which ruled out the possibility of Labour being able to play kingmaker between possible coalition blocs.

Both Fianna Fail and the Progressive Democrats were delighted by the decision to hold the election in the summer instead of the autumn; Fianna Fáil in particular feared the release in October or November of the report by the McCracken Tribunal, which was investing allegations that Ben Dunne Jnr. had bribed members of Fianna Fáil and that they had aided him in tax evasion.

The 1997 general election saw the public offered a choice of two possible coalitions. The existing government was a coalition of Fine Gael, the Labour Party and Democratic Left – called the Rainbow Coalition, while the opposition "alternative coalition" consisted of Fianna Fáil and the Progressive Democrats.

Campaigns

Rainbow coalition (Fine Gael, Labour, Democratic Left)
The outgoing Rainbow parties campaigned to re-elect the coalition and thus emphasized the working relationship that they had developed, running with the slogan 'Partnership That Works'. They claimed credit for a booming economy, improving social services and reforms such as the introduction of divorce. Despite this united front, each party fought its own campaign. Labour emphasised the number of campaign pledges it had managed to implement not only as part of the Rainbow government but also during its coalition with Fianna Fail.

Fianna Fáil campaign
Fianna Fáil under Bertie Ahern had been restructuring itself after its turbulent period under Charles Haughey and Albert Reynolds. The party's central office gained control of candidate selection and modernised its campaigning strategy, especially concerning vote management and controlling transfers under Ireland's PR electoral system. In addition, the bitter internal feuding that had dogged the party for decades was ended by Ahern's more unifying style of leadership. This leadership also allowed Fianna Fáil to run a very energetic campaign that emphasised Ahern's relative youth and enthusiasm, which distanced the party from scandals that had beset the party.

Progressive Democrats' campaign
Despite entering the election with polls suggesting they would overtake Labour as the third biggest party, and with Mary Harney as the most popular party leader, the Progressive Democrats struggled. Initially, it ran a presidential-style campaign that emphasized Harney. However, entering a pact with a resurgent Fianna Fáil meant it struggled to assert itself. In response, the PDs hastily published a manifesto — a move that backfired as it controversially called for single parent benefits to be cut in order to encourage single mothers to live with their parents. This drew fire from Pronsias De Rossa, who claimed Harney did "not have a bull's notion about social welfare". The Progressive Democrat's manifesto also called for the laying off of 25,000 public sector workers over five years, a proposal that was heavily criticised by the left-wing parties. In response, Fianna Fáil's leadership demanded a sit-down meeting with the Progressive Democrat leadership, and after the two parties publicly announced together that no layoffs would be made in the public sector without the consent of Irish trade unions. Harney also claimed her comments about unwed mothers had been misrepresented by the media.

Party slogans/Manifestos

Campaign topics

Sinn Féin and Northern Ireland
1997 was a pivotal year politically across the island of Ireland as the Troubles drew to an end and progress towards the forthcoming Good Friday Agreement was being made. Inevitably, the issue of Sinn Féin's participation in the election and each party's policy on Northern Ireland came up repeatedly during the campaign. Previous to the May 1997 United Kingdom general election, leader of Fine Gael John Bruton declared that if the IRA had not declared a ceasefire, then a vote for Sinn Féin would be a vote for violence. However, on 26 May, Labour leader and coalition partner Dick Spring stated that a vote for Sinn Féin in Northern Ireland would be a vote for peace. The opposition in the Dáil responded by declaring that the government was sending out mixed messaging about Sinn Féin and Northern Ireland.

In late May/early June, Bernie Ahern began attacking Bruton on the topic of Northern Ireland, criticising Bruton for not being the leading voice of "Nationalist Ireland" and promising that he would take this mantle if elected Taoiseach. Simultaneously, Sinn Féin leader Gerry Adams involved himself in the election by criticising Bruton's handling of the peace process. On 31 May, an active Provisional IRA landmine was discovered in Belfast, prompting Bruton to state he would "think very hard" before allowing any further contact between members of the government and Sinn Féin. Afterwards, the leader of the Democratic Left, Proinsias De Rossa, asked Ahern to clarify his "electoral support for Sinn Féin". Ahern denied he had ever lent support to Sinn Féin and went further by stating categorially he would rule Sinn Féin out of any possible coalition talks following the election. Ahern justified this by saying it would send the wrong message to Unionists in Northern Ireland to add Sinn Féin to a coalition.

Crime
The murder of journalist Veronica Guerin in June 1996 by drug lords in Dublin ensured that the subject of crime was a pressing one during the election. Although Fine Gael had traditionally been the "party of law and order" in Ireland, Fianna Fáil were able to seize on the subject of crime and declared they would have a "zero tolerance" approach to crime. Fianna Fáil Spokesperson on Crime, John O'Donoghue, was able to dictate the conversation and was also able, previous to the election, to convince the government to support his bill which gave greater powers to the Criminal Assets Bureau.

Opinion polls

Results

 
|}
The outgoing Ceann Comhairle retired at this election. Independents include Independent Fianna Fáil (11,607 votes, 1 seat).

Voting summary

Seats summary

Although Fine Gael gained seats, it crossed the Dáil chamber to the Opposition benches. Fianna Fáil also increased its representation, but the Progressive Democrats had a disastrous election, maintaining its share of the vote, but winning only four seats compared to ten at the previous election, losing seats thought safe such as Cork North-Central and Dún Laoghaire.

The Green Party won a second seat, with John Gormley elected in Dublin South-East. He was elected by just over 30 votes after a recount lasting four days saw Progressive Democrat Michael McDowell defeated. The loss of McDowell was particularly stinging to the Progressive Democrats as McDowell was their "chief ideologue".

One of the main features of the election, however, was the collapse of the Labour Party vote. Not only did it lose seats it had picked up in the 1992 general election, when its vote was at an all-time high – such as in Clare and Laois–Offaly – but it also lost reasonably safe seats, such as in Dublin North, Dublin Central and Cork South-Central. Dick Spring would retire as leader of the Labour Party later that year, after further disappointment in the presidential election.

Democratic Left also suffered, losing its two gains made in by-elections during the 27th Dáil. Sinn Féin won its first Dáil seat since 1957, with the party winning a seat in the Cavan–Monaghan constituency with the election of Caoimhghín Ó Caoláin, and taking seats for the first time since 1922. It also narrowly missed a seat in Kerry North. The Socialist Party, a Trotskyist party which consisted of former members of the Labour Party expelled in 1989, won its first seat in the Dublin West constituency.

Another seat change of note was the first capture of Cavan–Monaghan by Sinn Féin's Caoimhghín Ó Caoláin. When Ó Caoláin subsequently took his seat in the Dáil, it was the first time in 75 years a member of Sinn Féin had done so. Ó Caoláin's entry into the Dáil marked a major turning point in the history of Sinn Féin, who would continue to hold a presence in the Dáil to the present day.

Government formation
Following the election, none of the major parties had a clear majority. Negotiations resulted in a Fianna Fáil–Progressive Democrats coalition taking office. Four Independent Teachta Dála (TDs) also supported the government ensuring a working majority. Bertie Ahern became the Taoiseach while Mary Harney of the Progressive Democrats became Tánaiste.

Dáil membership changes
The following changes took place as a result of the election:
17 outgoing TDs retired, including the Ceann Comhairle, Seán Treacy
149 TDs stood for re-election
121 were re-elected
28 failed to be re-elected
45 successor TDs were elected
32 were elected for the first time
13 had previously been TDs
There were 6 successor female TDs, replacing 9 outgoing, decreasing the total number by 3 to 20
There were changes in 34 of the 41 constituencies contested

Outgoing TDs are listed in the constituency they contested in the election. For some, such as Kildare North, this differs from the constituency they represented in the outgoing Dáil. Where more than one change took place in a constituency the concept of successor is an approximation for presentation only.

See also
Members of the 21st Seanad

Notes

References

Further reading

External links
1997 election: Party leaders' debate RTÉ archives
Fianna Fail Election Manifesto 1997 Irish general election

General election, 1997
1997 in Irish politics
1997
28th Dáil
June 1997 events in Europe